Rain is a 2005 Bollywood erotic-thriller film directed by Amol Shetge and produced by Vinod Bachchan under the banner of V. R. Entertainers. It features actors Meghna Naidu and Himanshu Malik in the lead roles. Satish–Ajay scored the music for the film.

Plot 
Sandhya Bhatnagar, a blind writer with a mysterious past, lives alone and has and a serious rain phobia. One day she is visited by a reporter named Prakash who is a fan of her novels. He pretends to be her psychiatrist and persuades her to reveal her past – she had an unhappy childhood and was raped as a teenager. Sandhya ends up falling in love with the reporter, however, it turns out that Prakash is actually the rapist who caused her misery in the first place.

Cast 
 Himanshu Malik as Prakash/Avinash 
 Meghna Naidu as Sandhya Bhatnagar
 Panne Chatterjee as Avinash's wife 
 Rajdev Jamdade   
 Vijay Shukla

Music

References

External links 
 

2000s Hindi-language films
2000s erotic thriller films
Indian erotic thriller films
2005 films
Indian rape and revenge films
Films about writers
Films about blind people in India
Films directed by Amol Shetge